The 2006 United States Senate election in Texas was held November 7, 2006. Incumbent Republican Kay Bailey Hutchison won re-election to a third full term.

Major candidates

Democratic 
 Barbara Ann Radnofsky, attorney
 Gene Kelly, retired attorney & 2000 Democratic Senate Nominee
 Darrel Reece Hunter

Republican 
 Kay Bailey Hutchison, incumbent U.S. Senator

General election

Campaign 
The Democratic nominee had never run for public office and was expected to face an uphill battle in the general election, especially in a state that has not elected a Democrat statewide since 1994 and against a historically popular Hutchison. Since neither Radnofsky nor her main opponent, Gene Kelly, had received a majority of votes in the Democratic primary, a runoff was held April 11, 2006, which Radnofsky won. Radnofsky's campaign platform is available on her website. Scott Lanier Jameson won the Libertarian Party nomination at the party's state convention on June 10, 2006, defeating Timothy Wade and Ray Salinas.  Arthur W. Loux, a Roman Forest City Councilman and a member of the Minutemen, was running as an independent.

Hutchison co-sponsored legislation supporting the creation of a constitutional amendment that would limit terms for senators, but had been quoted saying that she would only leave after two terms if such a law applied to all senators. After deciding not to challenge Governor Rick Perry this year, as had been widely speculated, Hutchison was running for a third term.

She had no opposition in the 2006 Republican primary, and had approval ratings in the 60 percent range going into the election, although they had been slipping rapidly.

Debates 
Complete video of debate, October 19, 2006

Predictions

Polling

Results 

, this was the last time a Republican won Texas’s Class 1 Senate seat with over 60% of the vote, as well as the last time a Republican candidate for this seat won Dallas or Bexar counties.

To date, this is the most recent statewide election in which Dallas County voted for the Republican candidate.

See also 
 2006 United States Senate elections

References

External links 
Official campaign websites (Archived)
 Kay Bailey Hutchison
 Barbara Radnofsky
 Scott Jameson
 The Green Papers link on the Texas Midterm Election

Texas
2006
United States Senate